Oswyn Murray  (born 26 March 1937) is a Fellow of Balliol College, Oxford University and a distinguished classical scholar.

Murray is joint editor with John Boardman and Jasper Griffin of the Oxford History of the Classical World.

Boris Johnson was one of his students when he was reading Classics at Balliol College. He describes Johnson as "a buffoon and an idler". In 2018, when Johnson became prime minister, Murray sent his former student, in the ancient tradition, a renuntiatio amicitiae, a public revocation of their friendship.

Oswyn Murray is a great-grandson of the famous Scottish lexicographer James Augustus Henry Murray.

Selected publications
Sympotica: A symposium on the symposion. Oxford: Oxford University Press, 1990. (Ed.) 
Early Greece. Harvard University Press, 1993 (2nd edition).

References

External links
Picture of Oswyn Murray.

Living people
Fellows of Balliol College, Oxford
Fellows of the Society of Antiquaries of London
Members of the Royal Danish Academy of Sciences and Letters
1937 births